Nightwings is an album by jazz saxophonist Stanley Turrentine recorded for the Fantasy label in 1977 and featuring performances by Turrentine with an orchestra arranged and conducted by Claus Ogerman.

Reception
The Allmusic review by Michael Erlewine simply stated "Large group session for Fantasy".

Track listing
 "Papa "T"" (Stanley Turrentine) - 7:23
 "If You Don't Believe" (Clarence McDonald, Deniece Williams, Fritz Baskett) - 5:48
 "Joao" (Tommy Turrentine) - 3:40
 "Birdland" (Joe Zawinul) - 5:54
 "There's Music In the Air" (Caiphus Semenya, Will Jennings) - 4:14
 "Nightwings" (Claus Ogerman) - 3:49
 "Don't Give Up On Us" (Ogerman) - 5:19

Personnel
Stanley Turrentine - tenor saxophone
Randy Brecker, John Faddis, Earl Gardner, Alan Rubin, Lew Soloff - trumpet, flugelhorn
Paul Faulise, Urbie Green, Dave Taylor - trombone
Brooks Tillotson - French horn
Jerome Ashby,  Jim Buffington, John Clark, Don Corrado, Joseph De Angelis, Fred Griffen, Margaret Reill - French horn
Don Butterfield, Tony Price - tuba
Phil Bodner, Kenneth Harris, Hubert Laws, George Marge - flute
Paul Griffin - keyboards
Eric Gale, Lloyd Davis, Cornell Dupree - guitar
Ron Carter - bass
Gary King - electric bass
Charles Collins - drums
Errol "Crusher" Bennett - percussion
Unnamed String Section
Sanford Allen - concertmaster
Claus Ogerman - arranger, conductor

References

1977 albums
Stanley Turrentine albums
Fantasy Records albums
Albums arranged by Claus Ogerman